Chignik Lagoon Airport  is a state-owned, public-use airport serving Chignik Lagoon, in the Lake and Peninsula Borough of the U.S. state of Alaska. It is also known as Chignik Flats Airport. Scheduled airline service to King Salmon Airport is provided by Grant Aviation.

As per Federal Aviation Administration records, this airport had 566 commercial passenger boardings (enplanements) in calendar year 2008, an increase of 5% from the 538 enplanements in 2007. Chignik Lagoon Airport is included in the FAA's National Plan of Integrated Airport Systems (2009–2013), which categorizes it as a general aviation facility.

Airlines and destinations

Statistics

Facilities and aircraft 
Chignik Lagoon Airport has one runway designated 4/22 with a gravel surface measuring 1,810 by 60 feet (552 x 18 m). For the 12-month period ending December 21, 2007, the airport had 1,800 aircraft operations, an average of 150 per month: 61% air taxi and 39% general aviation.

See also 
 Chignik Airport 
 Chignik Bay Seaplane Base 
 Chignik Fisheries Airport 
 Chignik Lake Airport

References

External links 

Airports in Lake and Peninsula Borough, Alaska